Konteyevo is the name of several rural localities in Kostroma Oblast, Russia.

Modern localities
Konteyevo, Buysky District, Kostroma Oblast, a selo in Tsentralnoye Settlement of Buysky District;

Abolished localities
Konteyevo, Antropovsky District, Kostroma Oblast, a village in Antropovsky Selsoviet of Antropovsky District; abolished on December 27, 2004

References

Notes

Sources